Diego de Riaño (died 1534) was a Spanish architect of the Renaissance. He was one of the  most outstanding architects of the Plateresque style. 

He was born at Riaño, in Cantabria, and is documented in Seville starting from 1523. In 1527 he commenced the Collegiate of Valladolid and later was director of the works of the Cathedral of Seville, until his death in 1534. He also worked at the University of Osuna.

Works
His works include:
Casa consistorial, Seville
Sacristía de los Cálices, also in Seville
Four chapels at the choir of the Cathedral of Seville
Plans of the Cathedral of Valladolid (not constructed)
Works in the refectory of the Jerez Charterhouse, in 1533

See also
Renaissance architecture

Sources

Renaissance architects
Spanish Renaissance people
15th-century births
1534 deaths
Architects from Cantabria
People from Trasmiera
16th-century Spanish architects